This is a list of current and former electricity-generating power stations in England. For lists sorted by type, including proposed stations, see the see also section below.

Note that BEIS maintains a comprehensive list of UK power stations.

Thermal

Non-thermal

Hydropower and wave

Other hydropower schemes
Small hydropower sites in Great Britain with no further information.

 Gayle Mill, Hawes, North Yorkshire
 Itteringham Mill
 Marlingford Mill
 Marsh Mill
 Milford Mill
 Old Walls, Dartmoor
 Oldcotes Mill
 Oswestry, Llanfordda
 Ponts Mill Scheme
 River Dart Country Park, Dartmoor
 Sonning Mill
 St. Blazey
 Sturston Mill
 Talamh Life Centre
 Tellisford Mill, Somerset
 Trecarrell Mill
 Trelubbas

Wind power
 List of onshore wind farms in the United Kingdom
 List of offshore wind farms in the United Kingdom

See also

Lists sorted by type
 List of power stations in Scotland
 List of power stations in Wales
 List of power stations in Northern Ireland
 List of largest power stations in the world

References

External links 
 Power Plants Around the World Photo Gallery
 BBC.co.uk listing
 List of stations to close as they are opted out of LCPD
 Table of Potential New Conventional Electricity Generating Plants in Great Britain November 2007
 BERR list of power stations
 National Grid's seven year statement with list of current and planned connections
 'High Merit': Existing English Post-War Coal and Oil-Fired Power Stations in Context. Historic England Research Report 86/2016

Power stations
Eng
England